Jaabaali Maharshi (also known as Jabali Rishi) was a Hindu saint and philosopher. There are many saints and philosophers with the same name in Puranas.

Life
Jaabaali spent many years meditating on the banks of the Narmada River. The cave and marble rocks in this area were sometimes used as shelters. Jaabaali lived and practiced tapas in the sacred location of Tirumala, a place known today as "Jabali Theertham", near Tirupati. People now visit this place to solve serious Graha Doshas and worship the Gods Hanuman and Vigneswara.

Jabalis in history

Jabali of the Valmiki Ramayana

The hinduism's Ramayana of Valmiki was altered later to depict Jabali as a Charvaka Nastik or a Buddhist, however according to hindus both Charvaka and the Gautama Buddha had come generations or centuries after Rama, as Rama is claimed as a past incarnation of the Gautama Buddha in hindu scriptures. In the Ramayana, Rama strongly opposes and targets atheists as seen in Ayodhya Kanda of Ramayana, which reads, "atheists (nastikavadins) are fools who think they to be wise and who are experts in leading people to doom and ruin." Dasharatha’s council of priest-ministers headed by a religious authority, Sage Vasishtha, included sage Jabali, a materialist and atheist. Charvaka philosophy of atheism and materialism was widely criticized by Hinduism in past.

In story Rama strongly condemns atheism, but [Dasharatha]’s council of ministers included Jabali, who is a proclaimed Nastik. Bauddhavatara was accepted by all, so atheists also enjoyed same respect. The Indian Government recognizes Buddhism, which is considered Nastik by Hindu Orthodoxy and enjoys the privileges of secularism and religious tolerance provisions under the law.

In altered Ramayana, after performing last rites to Dasharatha, Bharat proceeds to the forest where Rama lives and begs him repeatedly to come back to Ayodhya and assume the responsibilities of a king, though it would call for breaking his promise given to his father to take care of the welfare of the citizens of Ayodhya, which is a priority for him. He finds strong support from Jabaali, one of the members of Dasharatha's council of priests. Jaabaali, with his Nastikavaada (Atheistic arguments), tries to convince Rama that it would be fitting and proper within the framework of Kshatriya Dharma to do so. Rama became quite upset by his distorted arguments and wrong council. His outburst is as follows.

I denounce the action of my father who picked up (as his consular priest) you (Jaabaali), a staunch unbeliever, who has not only stayed away from the path of righteousness but also whose mind is set on wrong path (opposed to the dharmic Vedic path), (nay) who is moving about (in the world) with such an ideology (conforming to the doctrine of Chaarvaaka, who believes only in the world of sensual pleasures) as has been set forth in your foregoing speech.

Mentions in Balakanda 
Then King Dasharatha said to his best minister Sumantra, "Let the Vedic scholars and ritual conductors like Sages Suyajna, Vaamadeva, Jaabaali, and Kaashyapa, along with the family priest Vashishta, as well as other Vedic Brahmans that are there, they all be invited swiftly..." [1-12-4, 5] Book I : Bala Kanda - Book Of Youthful Majesties, Chapter [Sarga] 12

Jabali of the Jabali Upanishad
In the Jabali Upanishad, Jabali tells the Pasupata philosophy about Jiva ("pasu") and Tsa (Pasupati).

Jabali wrote "Jabala Upanishad" ", and the story of Satyakama Jabali from Samaveda-Chandogyopanishad. It explains the true form of “maatri” devata, the duties a woman has to perform before she takes up the seat of “maatri” devata. It involves the relationship between the three forms or bodies of mother and child (gross, subtle and causal). It covers the true form of satya and how satya is the first step for attaining “Brahma Vidya”. It also covers the true form of “gotra”.

This is an excerpt of Jabali literature explaining one of the duties a woman has to perform before she takes up the seat of "maatri" devata:

Jaabali lived in a small shack of sticks and straws - a menage of crocks and clay-pot, where one earned out of hands and ate out of bracts. She threw a few twigs of firewood under the three stones and blew hard on them to kindle the fire. Then, she put a pail of water on the stove for heating. Those blasted twigs - they would burn, and go out quickly, belching smoke. The smoke would rise and spread everywhere. It would reach her eyes, and hurt them. So, she sat near the stove, she reflected. She had to keep on putting in the twigs of sorrow, just to keep alive. Only then could she expect a little warmth of happiness, and a flame of hope to rise. At times, sorrows and anguish wouldn't budge off from her neck, like the wet twigs - no matter how hard she blew upon them, the fire would fail to rise. It brought a dizziness to her mind, and tears to her eyes. The whole future seemed to plunge into darkness.

Jabali of Nellitirtham (Sri Somanatheshwara Cave Temple)
Jabali Maharshi Brindavana was recently constructed at Sri Somanatheshwara Cave temple, Nellitheertha, Karnataka. The Nellitheertha Somanatheshwara Cave temple is a holy temple in South Kanara. The main deity of the temple is Sri Somanatheshwara (Shiva), but it also honors Ganapati and Jabali Maharshi himself. In typical Tulu-nadu tradition, the temple also has its set of “Bhootas“. Bhootas are considered as the “Ganas” or warrior-assistants of the demigods. The main bhootas of the Nellitheertha temple are Pili-Chamundi (Pili means Tiger in Tulu), Kshetrapala, Raktheshwari and Doomavathy.

Jabali of Venkatachala Hill, Tirumala
The temple here in Jamalpuram, Andhra Pradesh is known as Jabali Tirtha. It is here that a Jabali Rishi performed penance and worshiped Vishnu. There is also a Venkatachala Purana, which was compiled. At this pilgrimage centre, Vishnu today is worshiped as Lord Venkatachala.

Jabali of Papavinasam Thirtham
A Jabali had also meditated and performed penance here.

Papavinasam Theertham is around 2 miles from Tirumala and is a beautiful waterfall. Like the Venkatachala Hill, at this pilgrimage centre, Vishnu today is worshiped as Lord Venkatachala. Hanuman is also worshiped here.

Jabali of Jalore
There was also a Jabali of Jalore, Rajasthan, of whom little is known. The city Jalore used to be known as Jabalipura.

Jabali of Valad
Jabali of this village in Gujarat had a daughter named Bala, who is said to have founded the village and after her it became known as "Balapuri", and eventually as "Balad" and "Valad". It was also said that bala eventually married Suryadev (sungod). There is a temple in valad devoted to Suryadev, Balamata, and the sun chariot.

There is still an idol of Saint Jabali in the village.

The Adhram of Madhavtirth is also situated here.

Jabali Rishi Aashram Jewar 
There is also a Aashram of Maharishi Jabali Rishi in Jewar, Gautam Buddha Nagar, Uttar Predash.

References

Vedic period